Connor is a Goidelic Celtic male given name, anglicised from the compound Irish word "Conchobhar", meaning "Lover of wolves” or "master of hounds" and sometimes taken to mean "hunter" or "wise". The most prominent person with this name in medieval Ireland was the Irish king Conchobar mac Nessa, a semi-legendary king in Ulster described in the Ulster Cycle of Irish mythology, and the name was probably first anglicised to 'Connor' by the Hiberno-Normans. The modern Irish often anglicise it with one 'n' to Conor. In the Roman Catholic Church there is also a formally canonized Blessed commonly named Saint Connor (Concobhar Ó Duibheannaigh)

Variant forms of Connor appear across Ireland, the UK and North America and include Conor, Conner and sometimes Konnor. “Conor” with a single 'n' was the most popular name given to boys in Ireland in 1999.

Historical figures
 Connor King of Connacht, 12th-century king
 Connor mac Tadg, 10th-century king and eponym of the Clan O'Connor
 Connor O'Brien, King of Thomond, 16th-century king
 Connor 'The Tawny' McKiernan, 14th-century chieftain
 Connor O'Brien, 3rd Earl of Thormond, 16th-century peer and militia leader
 Saint Connor O'Devany, 16th-century bishop and martyr
 Connor Maguire, 2nd Baron of Enniskillen, Irish peer and rebel leader
 Connor O'Brien, 2nd Viscount Clare (1605–1670), Irish peer

People named Connor

Actors
 Connor Gibbs (born 2001), Canadian actor
 Connor Paolo (born 1990), American actor
 Connor Swindells (Born 1996), English actor

Musicians
 Conor Oberst (born 1980), American singer-songwriter
 Conner Smith, American singer

Sportspeople

American football (gridiron)
 Connor Barth (born 1986), American football player
 Connor Barwin (born 1986), American football player
 Connor Davis (born 1994), American football player
 Connor Hamlett (born 1992), American football player
 Connor Heyward (born 1999), American football player
 Connor Hughes (American football) (born 1983), American football player
 Connor McGovern (American football, born 1993), American football player
 Connor McGovern (American football, born 1997), American football player
 Connor Shaw (born 1991), American football player
 Connor Williams (American football) (born 1997), American football player

Baseball
 Connor Robertson (born 1981), American baseball player
 Connor Seabold (born 1996), American baseball player
 Connor Wong (born 1996), American baseball player

Football (soccer)
 Connor Calcutt (born 1993), English footballer
 Connor Hughes (footballer) (born 1993), English footballer
 Connor James (soccer) (born 1996), Canadian soccer player
 Connor Pain (born 1993), Australian footballer
 Connor Randall (born 1995), English footballer
 Connor Wickham (born 1993), English footballer
 Connor Wood (footballer) (born 1996), English footballer

Ice hockey
 Connor Carrick (born 1994), American ice hockey player
 Connor Clifton (born 1995), American ice hockey player
 Connor Hellebuyck (born 1993), American ice hockey player
 Connor James (ice hockey) (born 1982), Canadian ice hockey player
 Connor McDavid (born 1997), Canadian ice hockey player
 Connor Murphy (born 1993), American ice hockey player

Other sports
 Connor Arendell (born 1990), American golfer
 Connor Behan (born 1991), British motorcycle racer 
 Connor Grimes (born 1983), Canadian field hockey player
 Connor Wood (basketball) (born 1993), Canadian basketball player
 Conor McGregor (MMA) (born 1988), Irish mixed martial artist

Other fields
 Connor Ball (born 1996), British musician
 Connor Brown (disambiguation), several people
 Connor Colquhoun (born 1996), British YouTuber and voice actor
 Connor Franta (born 1992), American vlogger
 Connor Michalek (2005–2014), American cancer patient

Fictional characters
 Connor (Angel), a primary character in the television series Angel
 Connor the Streamlined engine, in the television series Thomas & Friends
 Connor, one of the three android protagonists of the videogame Detroit: Become Human
 Ratonhnhaké:ton, the protagonist of Assassin's Creed III, who adopts the Westernised name "Connor Kenway" to pass in Colonial circles
 Connor Costello, in the Australian medical drama All Saints
 Connor Hawke, a DC Comics superhero
 Connor Kluff, in the manga and anime Tegami Bachi
 Connor Jung, a side character in the anime High School DxD
 Connor Lassiter, in the Neal Shusterman novel Unwind
 Connor MacLeod, in the Highlander film and television series
 Connor Mason, in the TV show Timeless
 Connor Murphy, in the Broadway musical Dear Evan Hansen
 Connor Perkins in the 2018 film The Hurricane Heist
 Dr. Connor Rhodes, a main character in the NBC medical drama Chicago Med
 Connor Rooney, in the 2002 film Road to Perdition
 Connor Temple, in the ITV series Primeval 
 Connor Walsh, in the television series How to Get Away with Murder
 Connor MacManus, in the movie Boondock Saints
 Connor Baily, in the book The Land of Stories
 Connor Roy, in the HBO series Succession
 Connor Owens, in the TV show Ugly Betty

People named Conner
 Conner Greene (born 1995), American baseball player
 Conner Henry (born 1963), American basketball coach
 Conner Reeves (born 1972), English singer and songwriter

Fictional characters
 Conner Kent, Superboy, from DC comics, cloned from both Superman and Lex Luthor
 Conner McKnight in the television series Power Rangers: Dino Thunder

People named Konnor
 Konnor (wrestler) (born 1980), ring name of Ryan Parmeter, American wrestler
 Konnor McClain (born 2005), American female artistic gymnast
 Konnor Pilkington (born 1997), American baseball player

See also
Connor (surname)
Connor (disambiguation)

References

English-language masculine given names
English masculine given names
Irish masculine given names